Lindenmuseum Clara Schumann is a small museum in , in the municipality of Müglitztal, near Dresden in Saxony, Germany. It is dedicated to the pianist and composer Clara Schumann, wife of the composer Robert Schumann.

Description
They were friends of Clara's father Friedrich Wieck.

The museum, built next to the tree, was opened in May 2006. There are displays about linden trees and in particular the Schmorsdorfer Linde; and about Schloss Maxen and Clara Schumann's relation with the village.

See also
 Schumann House, Leipzig
 Robert Schumann House
 List of music museums

References

Biographical museums in Germany
Music museums in Germany
Museums in Saxony